Arnoldi Chronica Slavorum is the continuation of Helmold's Chronica Slavorum by Arnold of Lübeck. It was continued down to 1209.

See also
 Arnoldi-Chronica-Slavorum:"Arnoldi Chronica Slavorum"

References

1209 books
West Slavic chronicles
13th-century history books
West Slavic history
History of Lübeck
13th-century Latin books